Bursledon railway station serves the village of Bursledon in Hampshire, England. It is on the West Coastway Line.  The station is operated by South Western Railway, who provide the majority of trains serving it (the exception being a peak-period service operated by Southern).

The station itself is located near a quay side on the River Hamble, where a number of yachts are moored, alongside a local Pub 'The Jolly Sailor'. The M27 crosses the water near the station. The train station has many local walks nearby, too, with access to Hamble via the Strawberry Trail.

Services
There is an hourly service between Southampton Central and Portsmouth & Southsea/Portsmouth Harbour operated by South Western Railway on each day of the week, with additional trains at weekday peak periods.

There is also one service in the morning peak to Southampton Central operated by Southern originating from London Victoria, calling at all stations to Southampton.

References

Railway stations in Hampshire
DfT Category F2 stations
Former London and South Western Railway stations
Railway stations in Great Britain opened in 1889
Railway stations served by South Western Railway
1889 establishments in England
Railway stations served by Govia Thameslink Railway